Polymer solutions are solutions containing dissolved polymers. These may be  (e.g. in ), or solid solutions (e.g. a substance which has been plasticized).

The introduction into the polymer of small amounts of a solvent (plasticizer) reduces the temperature of glass transition, the yield temperature, and the viscosity of a melt.
 An understanding of the thermodynamics of a polymer solution is critical to prediction of its behavior in manufacturing processes — for example, its shrinkage or expansion in injection molding processes, or whether pigments and solvents will mix evenly with a polymer in the manufacture of paints and coatings. A recent theory on the viscosity of polymer solutions gives a physical explanation for various well-known empirical relations and numerical values including the Huggins constant, but reveals also novel simple concentration and molar mass dependence.

Applications
Polymer solutions are used in producing fibers, films, glues, lacquers, paints, and other items made of polymer materials. Thin layers of polymer solution can be used to produce light-emitting devices. Guar polymer solution gels can be used in hydraulic fracturing ("fracking").

See also
 Flory–Huggins solution theory
 Colloid systems
 Gel
 Solution polymerization

References

Further reading
 

Polymer chemistry